The action of 8 May 1941 was a single ship action fought during the Second World War by the British heavy cruiser  and the Kriegsmarine (German Navy) auxiliary cruiser / (Raider F to the Admiralty). The engagement took place in the Indian Ocean off the Seychelles archipelago, north of Madagascar. Pinguin caused slight damage to Cornwall, before its fire on Pinguin caused an explosion and sank it.

Of the crew of   killed and  rescued along with  the Merchant Navy prisoners. Cornwall returned to Durban for repairs until 10 June.

Background

HMS Cornwall

Cornwall (Captain P. C. W. Manwaring) was a  heavy cruiser of the Kent subclass, built in the mid-1920s.

Pinguin

The auxiliary cruiser Pinguin ( Ernst-Felix Krüder), was originally the freighter Kandelfels, which had been launched in 1936. Pinguin was armed with six  guns, a  gun, two  anti-aircraft guns, four  autocannon, two torpedo tubes, 300 mines and an Arado Ar 196 A-1 floatplane. By 15 January, Pinguin (Raider F to the British) had  Norwegian merchant vessels by commerce raiding. It had captured three  factory ships and eleven whalers belonging to the same whaling company. The prizes were sent to Occupied France where one was renamed  and was used as minelayer for the German raiders in the South Atlantic and the Indian Ocean. In April, Pinguin sank three British merchant ships in the Indian Ocean, close to the Equator.

Prelude

After sinking Clan Buchanan on 28 April, Pinguin sailed north-west and on 4 May, fuelled and provisioned Adjutant, which was sent away to wait at a rendezvous near the Saya de Malha Bank. A plan was devised to catch the raider, using the Walrus spotter aircraft carried by Cornwall to close the raider's furthest on line and then search to cover the largest potential variations of the raiding ship's speed and course.

Farther west, the armed merchant cruiser , patrolled from the Equator to a position  to the south-west.

On the afternoon of 7 May, the two aircraft on Cornwall flew reconnaissance sorties for three hours and then altered course to get on the line of the main Vignot search. At  Cornwall turned onto a bearing of east-south-east and slowed to search on this line, before the moon set.

Battle

At  an aircraft was launched to give the bearing, course and speed of the suspected ship by wireless; the ship became visible from Cornwall at  The ship began transmitting raider reports, claiming to be Tamerlane. Despite orders to heave-to and two warning shots, the ship maintained course and speed for more than an hour, until the range was fewer than  yards. At  Cornwall turned to port and the suspected raider made a larger turn to port, opening fire with five guns just before 

Due to mechanical failures, Cornwall did not return fire for about two minutes and was frequently straddled by shells fired at a rapid rate, before firing two salvoes from the forward  The fore steering gear of Cornwall was disabled by a  shell hit and after going out of control for a moment, the after steering gear used. By  all of Cornwall's guns had opened fire, with the advantage of superior range finders and director fire-control systems, instead of local gun control.

Aftermath

Analysis
The commerce-raiding voyage of the Pinguin had lasted from 22 June 1940 – 8 May 1941 and the ship sank or captured  of  About  of shipping was sent to Germany as prizes. Cornwall returned to Durban for repairs until 10 June; the tactics of the captain of Cornwall in shadowing, attempted to identify and closing with Pinguin was criticised by the Admiralty. The crew of Pinguin had been skilful in disguising the ship and it was difficult to approach a suspicious, yet unidentified ship. A raider had the tactical advantage in deciding when to open fire, before it was unmasked and investigating ships courted danger if the vessel approached from a direction favourable to a raider's guns and torpedoes. Allied ships were given secret call signs and a system was devised for the investigating ship to refer to the Admiralty by wireless to verify ship identities. The new methods made ship identification much easier but took months to implement and similar events occurred when ships were either allowed to sail on and turned out to be raiders or were intercepted and sprang a surprise on the British warship.

The success against Pinguin and other raiders was due to the navy Operational Intelligence Centre (OIC) of the Naval Intelligence Division, at the Admiralty. The OIC tracked raiders, based on the position of the sinking of Allied merchant ships and by collating rare sightings and distress signals. German commerce-raiders kept radio silence, avoided common shipping routes, searched for independently routed vessels and tried to prevent their victims from transmitting wireless messages. From May to November 1941, the Germans lost Pinguin and two more commerce raiders but Enigma decrypts by the Government Code and Cypher School (GC&CS) were only involved in one sinking.

The seven raiders at sea in May 1941 had sailed in 1940 before Enigma intelligence became available to the British. When at sea, Enigma-equipped raiders used the  settings if they broke radio silence, which Hut 4 at Bletchley Park never managed to penetrate.

Casualties
A British sailor, near the stern of Cornwall, was killed when Pinguin opened fire.

Footnotes

Bibliography

Further reading

External links
 Allen, T. Pinguin wrecksite
 Waters, S. D. Operations of the Pinguin, in Episodes & Studies Volume 1, RNZ Navy, 1956

Conflicts in 1941
Naval battles of World War II involving Germany
A
Maritime incidents in May 1941
History of Seychelles
British Seychelles
1940s in Seychelles
May 1941 events
Germany–United Kingdom military relations